Jonathan Aris is a British actor who has appeared in films, television and the theatre. He has narrated three TV documentaries produced and aired by the National Geographic Channel, and appears as Philip Anderson in the BBC television series Sherlock. In 2016 he appeared in Tutankhamun as the American Egyptologist Herbert Winlock, and appears as the angelic quartermaster in the Amazon Prime series Good Omens.

Filmography

Film

Television

Theatre

Video games

References

External links 

British male film actors
British male stage actors
British male television actors
People educated at St Paul's School, London
Living people
Alumni of Camberwell College of Arts
Year of birth missing (living people)